Lower Lake may refer to

 Lower Lake, California, a census-designated place in the United States
 Lower Lake, Bhopal, a lake in India